Martha Cheney (born 1953) is the author of several titles in the Gifted & Talented book series, which sold more than one million copies.  She currently resides in Huson, Montana. She was also a contributing lyricist to the acclaimed children's music videos, "Baby Songs", whose words were set to the music of Hap Palmer, her former husband. Cheney has a B.A. from University of North Carolina Wilmington (1975) and a M.A. (2002) and Ed.D. (2004) from the University of Montana.

References 

Living people
American children's writers
American family and parenting writers
American lyricists
Writers from Montana
1953 births
20th-century American women writers
20th-century American non-fiction writers
21st-century American women writers
University of Montana alumni
University of North Carolina at Wilmington alumni
American women non-fiction writers
21st-century American non-fiction writers